Gary Allan "Gubbio" Gambucci (born September 22, 1946 in Hibbing, Minnesota) is an American retired ice hockey forward who played in 51 games in the National Hockey League with the Minnesota North Stars and 112 games for the Minnesota Fighting Saints of the World Hockey Association between 1971 and 1976. Internationally Gambucci played for the American national team at four World Championships.

Playing career
Before turning professional, Gambucci excelled as a scorer for the United States national team at the 1969, 1970 and 1971 1971 World Championships as well as the University of Minnesota hockey team. Gambucci was signed as a free agent by the Montreal Canadiens in the spring of 1971 after scoring seven goals in ten games for Team USA at the 1971 world championships in Bern (he was also elected to the tournament all star team at the world championship "Pool B" qualifying tournament in 1970). The Canadiens immediately traded him and Bob Paradise to the North Stars for cash. However, Gambucci failed to become a regular in Minnesota and left the NHL for the Minnesota Fighting Saints of the rival World Hockey Association following the 1973–74 season. Gambucci retired from professional hockey in 1976 after playing 112 WHA regular season games for the Fighting Saints as well as representing the United States at the 1976 World Championships in Katowice, Poland.

Career statistics

Regular season and playoffs

International

Awards and honors

External links
 

1946 births
Living people
AHCA Division I men's ice hockey All-Americans
American men's ice hockey centers
Cleveland Barons (1937–1973) players
Ice hockey players from Minnesota
Jacksonville Barons players
Johnstown Jets players
Minnesota Fighting Saints players
Minnesota Golden Gophers men's ice hockey players
Minnesota North Stars players
Portland Buckaroos players
Sportspeople from Hibbing, Minnesota
Undrafted National Hockey League players